In geometry, the augmented pentagonal prism is one of the Johnson solids. As the name suggests, it can be constructed by augmenting a pentagonal prism by attaching a square pyramid to one of its equatorial faces.

External links
 
 

Johnson solids